Lieutenant Commander George Nicholson Bradford VC (23 April 1887 – 23 April 1918) was an officer in the Royal Navy and an English recipient of the Victoria Cross, the highest award for gallantry in the face of the enemy that can be awarded to British and Commonwealth forces. His brother, Roland Bradford, was also awarded the Victoria Cross, making them the only brothers to be awarded the medal during the First World War.

Early life
Bradford was born in Witton Park, County Durham, on 23 April 1887 to George Bradford and Amy Marion Andrews. He had three brothers, Thomas Andrews, James Barker and Roland Boys, all of whom served in the First World War. He attended Barnard Castle School.

First World War
He died on 23 April 1918, his 31st birthday, committing the act for which he was awarded the cross. The citation for his Victoria Cross read:

Two of his brothers, Brigadier General Roland Bradford and Second Lieutenant James Barker Bradford, also died in service. His VC is on display in the Lord Ashcroft Gallery at the Imperial War Museum, London.

References

External links
 (summary, photos, links to further biographical and CWGC details within site)

1887 births
1918 deaths
Royal Navy officers
British World War I recipients of the Victoria Cross
British military personnel killed in World War I
Royal Navy recipients of the Victoria Cross
People from Witton Park
Royal Navy officers of World War I
People educated at Barnard Castle School
Military personnel from County Durham